Major General Friedrich Wilhelm von Steuben is a bronze statue of Friedrich Wilhelm von Steuben, executed by sculptor Albert Jaegers. It is erected in Lafayette Park in Washington, D.C.

History
The statue was cast in 1909 and 1910 at a cost of $50,000. It honors Friedrich Wilhelm von Steuben, the Baron von Steuben, a Prussian soldier who joined the Continental Army and instructed the American forces in Prussian military discipline and tactics, allowing them to gain skills necessary to challenge British forces.  Von Steuben became a naturalized American citizen after leaving the army in 1784 and received a land grant in New York. 

The statue was dedicated on December 7, 1910.

Depiction
The bronze statue is of a standing Baron von Steuben in Continental Army uniform (with sash, boots, tricorn hat, and cape) looking into the distance while inspecting Continental Army soldiers in 1778. The statue sits atop a square pink granite base: the front and back feature ornament reliefs, and the left and right have figures in bronze. The base is flanked by two sets of allegorical figures: one to the southwest and the other to the northeast. The figures on the northeast side are two male figures symbolizing military instruction and the figures on the southwestern side are two female figures symbolizing commemoration.

Inscription
The front of the base has the following inscription (topped by an American eagle): 

ERECTED.BY.THE.CONGRESS/OF.THE.VNITED.STATES. TO/FREDERICK.WILLIAM.AVGVSTVS.HENRY.FERDINAND/BARON.VON.STEVBEN/IN.GRATEFVL .RECOGNITION .OF.HIS/SERVICES/TO/THE/AMERICAN.PEOPLE/IN.THEIR.STRVGGLE.FOR.LIBERTY/BORN.IN PRVSSIA/SEPTEMBER 17, 1730/DIED.IN.NEW.YORK./NOVEMBER 28, 1794/AFTER.SERVING.AS AIDE./DE.CAMP.TO.FREDERICK/THE.GREAT.OF PRVSSIA/HE.OFFERED.HIS.SWORD/TO.THE.AMERICAN.COLONIES.AND WAS APPOINT/ED.MAJOR.GENERAL AND/INSPECTOR GENERAL IN/THE CONTINENTAL ARMY/HE GAVE MILITARY.TRAIN-/ING.AND.DISCIPLINE.TO/THE.CITIZEN.SOLDIERS/WHO.ACHIEVED.THE.IN-/DEPENDENCE.OF.THE/VNITED.STATES. ./M.C.M.X 

The rear of the base contains profiles in relief of von Steuben's aides-de-camp, Colonel William North and Major Benjamin Walker,  and the following inscription:

COLONEL.WILLIAM.NORTH/.MAJOR.BENJAMIN.WALKER/.AIDES.AND.FRIENDS/OF.GENERA.VON.STEVBEN

See also
 American Revolution Statuary
 List of public art in Washington, D.C., Ward 2

References

External links
 

1910 sculptures
Steuben
Bronze sculptures in Washington, D.C.
Historic district contributing properties in Washington, D.C.
Lafayette Square, Washington, D.C.